Wincenty Okołowicz  (26 June 1906 – 3 September 1979) was a Polish geographer and an expert in geomorphology and climatology. He is best known as the author of the 1965 major Polish classification of world's climates, Climatic Zones of the World.

Early life 
Okołowicz was born in a small village of Boków, near Pidhaitsi, Ukraine.

Career 
In 1945, he became one of the first employees of the newly formed Department of Geography, at the Nicolaus Copernicus University in Toruń.  He became a professor at Warsaw University in 1952.  From 1953 to 1959, he was the 
director of the State Hydrological and Meteorological Institute.

From 1956 to 1959, he was a vice-chairman of the Polish Academy of Sciences's Commission for the "International Geophysical Year. He is the author of a map of climatic spheres (1965) as well as the first Polish textbook for climatology (Klimatologia ogólna, 1969).

Okołowicz died September 3, 1979 in Warsaw.

References

1906 births
1979 deaths
Academic staff of Nicolaus Copernicus University in Toruń
Polish climatologists
Polish geographers
Polish geomorphologists
20th-century geographers